Arthur Thomas Myers (16 April 1851 – 10 January 1894) was a British physician and sportsman. As a tennis player he participated in two Wimbledon Championships and also played first-class cricket.

While studying at Trinity College, Cambridge, in 1870, Myers played a first-class cricket match for Cambridge University against the Marylebone Cricket Club. He batted in the middle order and scored seven in the first innings, then six in the second. He was a Cambridge Apostle.

In 1878 he competed in his first Wimbledon and made it into the quarter-finals, before being defeated in straight sets by eventual champion Frank Hadow. The following year he won his first two matches and was eliminated in the third round, by Irishman C. D. Barry.
 
Myers suffered from epilepsy and is believed to have taken his own life in 1894.  John Hughlings Jackson published a study of his case.

He was the brother of scholar Frederic William Henry Myers and poet Ernest Myers.

Notes

References

1851 births
1894 deaths
Alumni of Trinity College, Cambridge
19th-century English medical doctors
English male tennis players
British male tennis players
English cricketers
Cambridge University cricketers
19th-century male tennis players
1890s suicides
Suicides in Westminster